Psychomotor retardation  involves a slowing down of thought and a reduction of physical movements in an individual. It can cause a visible slowing of physical and emotional reactions, including speech and affect.

Psychomotor retardation is most commonly seen in people with major depression and in the depressed phase of bipolar disorder; it is also associated with the adverse effects of certain drugs, such as benzodiazepines. Particularly in an inpatient setting, psychomotor retardation may require increased nursing care to ensure adequate food and fluid intake and sufficient personal care. Informed consent for treatment is more difficult to achieve in the presence of this condition.

Causes 
 Psychiatric disorders – schizophrenia, severe depression, bipolar disorder, eating disorders, anxiety disorders, etc.

 Psychiatric medicines (if taken as prescribed or improperly, overdosed, or mixed with alcohol)
 Parkinson's disease
 Genetic disorders -  Wiedemann–Steiner syndrome, Say–Meyer syndrome, Qazi–Markouizos syndrome, Tranebjaerg-Svejgaard syndrome, etc.

Examples 

Examples of psychomotor retardation include the following:
 Unaccountable difficulty in carrying out what are usually considered "automatic" or "mundane" self care tasks for healthy people (i.e., without depressive illness) such as taking a shower, dressing, grooming, cooking, brushing teeth, and exercising.
 Physical difficulty performing activities that normally require little thought or effort, such as walking up stairs, getting out of bed, preparing meals, and clearing dishes from the table, household chores, and returning phone calls.
 Tasks requiring mobility suddenly (or gradually) may inexplicably seem "impossible". Activities such as shopping, getting groceries, taking care of daily needs, and meeting the demands of employment or school are commonly affected.
 Activities usually requiring little mental effort can become challenging. Balancing a checkbook, making a shopping list, and making decisions about mundane tasks (such as deciding what errands need to be done) are often difficult.

In schizophrenia, activity level may vary from psychomotor retardation to agitation; the patient experiences periods of listlessness and may be unresponsive, and at the next moment be active and energetic.

See also 
 Psychomotor learning
 Psychomotor agitation

References

External links 

Symptoms and signs of mental disorders
Motor control
Mood disorders